The Eastern Breithorn but also referred as the western Breithorn Twin, is a peak of the Pennine Alps, located on the border between Switzerland and Italy, between the canton of Valais and the region of Aosta Valley. It is part of the Breithorn range, located east of the Theodul Pass. It lies between the Central Breithorn and its other twin, the Gendarm (or eastern Breithorn Twin). On its north side it overlooks the Breithorn Glacier.

References

External links
Eastern Breithorn on Summitpost.org

Alpine four-thousanders
Mountains of the Alps
Mountains of Aosta Valley
Mountains of Valais
Pennine Alps
Italy–Switzerland border
International mountains of Europe
Mountains of Switzerland
Four-thousanders of Switzerland